Dr. Neelkanth Tiwari is an Indian politician and Minister of State in Government of Uttar Pradesh in Yogi Adityanath ministry. He is member of Uttar Pradesh Legislative Assembly representing Varanasi South which was represented by Shyamdev Roy Chaudhari seven times, from 1989 to 2017 until he was elected in 2017. He married Poonam Tiwari on 25 June 1994 and they had one son named Shambhav Tiwari (born 30 November) and one daughter named Shambhavi Tiwari (born 21 December).

Dr. Tiwari got the ministries of Law and Justice, Information, Sports and youth welfare. He is the Tourism Minister of Uttar Pradesh.

References

Living people
Bharatiya Janata Party politicians from Uttar Pradesh
State cabinet ministers of Uttar Pradesh
Uttar Pradesh MLAs 2017–2022
Yogi ministry
Politicians from Varanasi
Uttar Pradesh MLAs 2022–2027
1971 births